The table below lists the reasons delivered from the bench by the Supreme Court of Canada during 2001. The table illustrates what reasons were filed by each justice in each case, and which justices joined each reason. This list, however, does not include decisions on motions.

Of the 90 judgments released in 2001, 16 were oral, and 68 were unanimous, with 4 motions.

Reasons

Justices of the Supreme Court

Notes

External links
 2001 decisions: CanLII LexUM

Table key

Reasons of The Supreme Court of Canada, 2001
2001